George Edward Maxwell Wright (August 2, 1943 – June 26, 2019) was an American actor, known for his role as Willie Tanner on the sitcom ALF (1986–1990).

Early life
Wright was born August 2, 1943, in Detroit, Michigan.

He moved to the suburb of Southfield as a child, graduating from Southfield Senior High School in 1961. While a student at Southfield, he was very active in the theatre program and had leads in two different musical productions.

Career

Film and television
Wright made supporting appearances on television shows such as WKRP in Cincinnati, and was a regular cast member on Misfits of Science, AfterMASH, Buffalo Bill, and The Norm Show, and the made-for-TV adaptation of Stephen King's The Stand. He appeared in the first and second seasons of the sitcom Friends as Terry, the manager of Central Perk. He played Günter Wendt in the 1998 HBO miniseries From the Earth to the Moon and Dr. Josef Mengele in Playing for Time.

ALF
From 1986 to 1990, Wright appeared in the sitcom ALF as Willie Tanner, a typical father of a middle-class family, who finds an alien who has crash-landed on Earth. Despite becoming his best-known performance, the actor despised the role due to its huge technical demands and the fact that he, a human, played a supporting character for an "inanimate object". "It was hard work and very grim", he stated in a 2000 interview to People. He was also, reportedly, very happy when the show was canceled in 1990. "I was hugely eager to have it over with", he said in the same interview. According to his co-star in the show, Anne Schedeen, "there was one take, and Max walked off the set, went to his dressing room, got his bags, went to his car, and disappeared. Nobody had to say, 'Wrap,' and there were no goodbyes". However, Wright later admitted that as the years passed he looked back at ALF with less animosity and conceded that "It doesn't matter what I felt or what the days were like, ALF brought people a lot of joy."

Stage
Wright also had a stage career. In 1968, he appeared in the original production of The Great White Hope at the Arena Stage in Washington, D.C. In 1998, he appeared on Broadway in Ivanov, which garnered him a Tony nomination, and played Sir Andrew in Twelfth Night at Lincoln Center for the Performing Arts. In 2007, he acted at the JET (Jewish Ensemble Theatre) in Detroit and in the production of No Man's Land at the American Repertory Theater. He also appeared in The Public Theater's 2010 production of The Winter's Tale and The Merchant of Venice at Shakespeare in the Park festivals.

Personal life
Wright was married to Linda Ybarrondo from 1965 until her death from breast cancer in 2017. The couple had two children.

In 1995, he was diagnosed with lymphoma, which was successfully treated and remained in remission until 2019.

Death
He died from the disease on June 26, 2019, at the age of 75 at the Lillian Booth Actors Home in Englewood, New Jersey.

Filmography

Film

Television

Source:

References

External links
 
 
 

1943 births
2019 deaths
20th-century American male actors
21st-century American male actors
American male film actors
American male stage actors
American male television actors
Deaths from cancer in New Jersey
Deaths from lymphoma
Male actors from Detroit
Wabash College alumni